CV11 or variation, may refer to:

  is a U.S. Navy Essex-class aircraft carrier that was in commission from 1943 through 1974
 CV11 postcode (UK); see CV postcode area
 Toyota Camry CV11 is a diesel version of the first generation Camry that was produced for model years 1983 through 1986

See also

 CV (disambiguation)